Norilsk is a city in Krasnoyarsk Krai, Russia.

Norilsk may also refer to:

Norilsk (band), Gatinea, Quebec based noise band
Norilsk Airport, aka Alykel Airport, nr. Norilsk
MFK Norilsk Nickel, Russian futsal club

See also
Norilsk uprising